Jalaja is an Indian actress in Malayalam films who was active during the 1970s and 1980s. She had won Kerala State Film Award for Best Actress and Filmfare Award for Best Actress in 1981 for the movie Venal directed by Lenin Rajendran.

Personal life
She was born on 13 December 1961 to a Professor Thakazhiyil Vasudevan Pillai and Saraswathiyamma in Malaysia. She studied there till her fourth grade and then migrated to India, due to Civil war in Malaysia. She had her primary education from Asan Memorial Senior Secondary School, Madras, Ambalappuzha English Medium School and her Pre-degree from St. Joseph College, Alappuzha. She did her bachelor's degree and Masters in English Literature from Women's college Thiruvananthapuram. She is married to Prakash Nair since 3 September 1993 & has settled in Bahrain after her marriage. They have a daughter Devi. She was the jury member for Kerala state film awards 2014.

Awards
Kerala State Film Awards:

 1981 Best Actress - Venal 
 1981 Filmfare Award for Best Actress - Venal

Filmography

Malayalam

Tamil

Television serials
Indraneelam (Surya TV)
Verukal (Asianet) as Amlu - based on Malayattoor Ramakrishnan's Novel Directed by T.N. Gopakumar
Ammuvukku Kalyanam as Gayathri (DD Tamil) - Tamil Serial

References

External links

Living people
Actresses from Kerala
Filmfare Awards South winners
Kerala State Film Award winners
20th-century Indian actresses
Actresses in Malayalam cinema
Indian film actresses
1961 births
Actresses in Tamil cinema
Indian television actresses
Actresses in Malayalam television
Actresses in Tamil television